The large moth family Gelechiidae contains the following genera:

Elasiprora
Emmetrophysis
Empalactis
Empedaula
Empista
Encentrotis
Enchrysa
Encolapta
Encolpotis
Ephelictis
Ephysteris
Epibrontis
Epidola
Epilechia
Epimesophleps
Epimimastis
Epistomotis
Erikssonella
Eripnura
Eristhenodes
Erythriastis
Ethirostoma
Ethmiopsis
Euchionodes
Eucordylea
Eudactylota
Euhomalocera
Eulamprotes
Eunebristis
Eunomarcha
Euryctista
Eurysacca
Eustalodes
Euzonomacha
Exceptia
Excommatica
Exoteleia

References

 Natural History Museum Lepidoptera genus database

Gelechiidae
Gelechiid